Nikarete was a madam from Corinth, who lived in the 5th and 4th century BC. 

Nikarete operated a "bettering" establishment in Corinth, a city famous in antiquity for its prostitution trade. From Corinth and Greek literature comes the verb korinthiazein, which loosely translated means "to fornicate". 

Nikarete is said to be a freedwoman, who was previously owned by a man called Charisios. When she gained her freedom, she married Charisios' cook and moved to Corinth. Nikarete bought young girls from the Corinthian slave market and trained them as hetaera, to let them make their own living.  According to Apollodorus, it was her custom to rent out her hetaeras during their prime, then sold them off, which implied a 100-percent manumission rate. 

Through a kind of parental relationship Nikarete sought to increase the price her customers had to pay (free women were usually higher in demand). Nikarete's most famous hetaera Neaira, for instance, whom she bought along with six other girls was marketed as her own daughter so that she commanded higher prices. It was during the lawsuit Against Neaira that Nikarete's activities further gained notoriety as the younger hetaera described her life to fight against accusations that she illegally married an Athenian man. 

There is a possibility that Nikarete was not a single individual or even a real person. The name Nikarete has either been attributed to artistic interpretation or to an error in referring to different individuals (Neaira or Nicarete of Megara).

In fiction
In Tom Holland's book "Persian Fire" he states: korinthiazein - 'to do a Corinthian' - means to fuck. 

In Aristophanes "Wealth" Chremylus says "They say that in Corinth the tarts there, when a customer come's in who's poor, they just ignore him, but a rich man gets instant admission - even by the back entrance!"

References

Ancient Corinthians
5th-century BC births
4th-century BC deaths
4th-century BC Greek people
Ancient businesswomen
4th-century BC Greek women
5th-century BC Greek women
Greek brothel owners and madams
Slave owners
Ancient Greek businesspeople
Slavery in ancient Greece